Bernard Jay Leiderman (born February 14, 1956) is an American composer and songwriter.  His best-known works are his theme music compositions for public radio programs, including National Public Radio's Morning Edition, Weekend Edition, Wait Wait... Don't Tell Me!, Science Friday, and American Public Media's Marketplace.

Leiderman attended Virginia Tech, but dropped out and became a stage actor, then a cameraman at WTAR (now WTKR) in Norfolk, Virginia. He later studied broadcast journalism at American University in Washington, D.C. Leiderman's Morning Edition theme music was used for 40 years, from the show's first broadcast on November 5, 1979 until May 3, 2019.

As of 2013, Leiderman lived in Swannanoa, North Carolina. He produced his debut album BJ (2017), featuring The Randall Bramblett Band and Béla Fleck.

References

External links

"Composing For National Public Radio: A Conversation With BJ Leiderman" - KPBS, March 29, 2011 by Angela Carone, Jocelyn Maggard, Maureen Cavanaugh

1956 births
Living people
Emmy Award winners
American public radio personalities
Musicians from Norfolk, Virginia
20th-century American composers
21st-century American composers
American male composers
20th-century American male musicians
21st-century American male musicians